The assembly line feeding problem (abbr. ALFP) describes a problem in operations management concerned with finding the optimal way of feeding parts to assembly stations. For this, various cost elements may be taken into account and every part is assigned to a policy, i.e., a way of feeding parts to an assembly line. The most common policies are:
 Line stocking (also: line side stocking, pallet to work-station, etc)
 Boxed-supply (also: Kanban, batch  supply, etc.)
 Sequencing 
 Stationary kitting (also:  indirect supply, trolley to workstation)
 Traveling kitting (also:  indirect supply, kit to assembly line)

These policies differ with respect to the way parts are brought to the line as well as in the way parts are handled before they are brought to the line. E.g., in line stocking, parts are brought to the line directly in the way they are stored in the warehouse. In the other policies, quantities are reduced (boxed supply) and different part variants are sorted in the order of demand (sequencing, stationary, and traveling kitting).

History 
The problem was formally introduced by Bozer and McGinnis in 1992 by means of a descriptive cost model. Since then, many contributions have been made in both, quantitative and qualitative manners. E.g., a more qualitative contribution is done by Hua and Johnson investigating important aspects of the problem, whereas more recent contributions focus rather on quantitative aspects and use mathematical optimization to solve this assignment problem to optimality

Mathematical problem statement 

This model minimizes the costs  when assigning all parts (index:i) to a feeding policy (index:p) at all stations (index:s) , if there is a demand for a part at a station . Using a certain policy at a station  incurs some cost  as well as some other costs  are incurred when a policy is used at any station .

All assembly line feeding problems of this type have been proven to be NP-hard

References 

Manufacturing
Production economics